On 3 August 1979, Constitutional Convention election was held in West Azerbaijan Province constituency with plurality-at-large voting format in order to decide three seats for the Assembly for the Final Review of the Constitution.

Each of the seats in the constituency went to a party. The Khomeinist candidate supported by the Islamic Republican Party was placed first, while the candidate endorsed by the Muslim People's Republic Party of Mohammad Kazem Shariatmadari became second. The two Kurdish candidates who belonged to the Democratic Party of Iranian Kurdistan ended up in the third and fourth places, and the party was able to secure a seat. The Organization of Iranian People's Fedai Guerrillas' nominee received no more than 11% of the votes and was defeated.

Results 

 
 
 
|-
|colspan="14" style="background:#E9E9E9;"|
|-
 
 
 
 
 

|-
|colspan=14|
|-
|colspan=14|Source:

References

1979 elections in Iran
West Azerbaijan Province